Queen Victoria, the British monarch from 1837 to 1901, and Prince Albert (her husband from 1840 until his death in 1861) had 9 children, 42 grandchildren, and 87 great-grandchildren.

Overview
Victoria and Albert had 20 grandsons and 22 granddaughters, of whom two (the youngest sons of Prince Alfred and Princess Helena) were stillborn, and two more (Prince Alexander John of Wales and Prince Harald of Schleswig-Holstein) died shortly after birth. Their first grandchild was the future German Emperor Wilhelm II, who was born to their eldest child, Princess Victoria, on 27 January 1859; the youngest was Prince Maurice of Battenberg, born on 3 October 1891 to Princess Beatrice (1857–1944), who was herself the last child born to Victoria and Albert and the last child to die. The last of Victoria and Albert's grandchildren to die (almost exactly 80 years after Queen Victoria herself) was Princess Alice, Countess of Athlone (25 February 1883 – 3 January 1981).

Just as Victoria and Albert shared one grandfather (Duke Francis of Saxe-Coburg-Saalfeld) and one grandmother (Countess Augusta Reuss), two pairs of their grandchildren married each other. In 1888, Princess Irene of Hesse and by Rhine, whose mother was Queen Victoria's daughter Alice, married Prince Henry of Prussia, a son of Victoria's daughter Victoria. Another of Alice's children, Grand Duke Ernest Louis of Hesse, married Princess Victoria Melita, a daughter of Alice's brother Alfred, Duke of Saxe-Coburg and Gotha, in 1894, but divorced in 1901.

Prince Albert, the Prince Consort (26 August 1819 – 14 December 1861), lived long enough to see only one of his children (the Princess Royal) married and two of his grandchildren born (Wilhelm II, 1859–1941, and his sister Princess Charlotte of Prussia, 1860–1919), while Queen Victoria (24 May 1819 – 22 January 1901) lived long enough to see not only all her grandchildren, but many of her 87 great-grandchildren as well. (Three of Victoria's 56 great-grandsons were stillborn, another died shortly after birth, and one of her 31 great-granddaughters was born out of wedlock.)

Victoria, the Princess Royal and first child of Victoria and Albert (21 November 1840 – 5 August 1901), known as "Vicky", was not only mother to their first grandchild, Wilhelm II, she was also the first of Victoria and Albert's children to become a grandparent, with the birth in 1879 of Princess Feodora of Saxe-Meiningen, who was the daughter of Princess Charlotte (Queen Victoria's first granddaughter). She was also the grandmother of the last of Victoria and Albert's great-granddaughters to die, Princess Katherine of Greece and Denmark (4 May 1913 – 2 October 2007), daughter of Vicky's fourth daughter, Queen Sophia of Greece. After Katherine's death in 2007, the only surviving great-grandchild of Queen Victoria was Count Carl Johan Bernadotte of Wisborg (31 October 1916 – 5 May 2012), born to Crown Princess Margaret of Sweden, daughter of Victoria and Albert's third son, Prince Arthur, Duke of Connaught and Strathearn.

The death of Count Carl Johan Bernadotte marked the end of a generation of royalty that began in 1879 with the birth of Princess Feodora and included the British Kings Edward VIII and George VI, the Norwegian King Olav V, the Romanian King Carol II and the Greek Kings George II, Alexander and Paul—as well as six uncrowned victims of political assassination, Earl Mountbatten of Burma (last Viceroy of India), Tsarevich Alexei of Russia and Alexei's sisters the Grand Duchesses Olga, Tatiana, Maria and Anastasia.

Queen Victoria's own death in January 1901 was preceded by the deaths of three of her own children (Princess Alice in December 1878, Prince Leopold in March 1884, and Prince Alfred in July 1900) and soon followed by the Princess Royal's death in August 1901. Aside from the four boys who died as infants, Queen Victoria had survived seven of her grandchildren:

 Prince Sigismund of Prussia (1864–1866) died of meningitis.
 Prince Friedrich of Hesse and by Rhine (1870–1873), a haemophiliac, fell from his mother's bedroom window and bled to death a few hours later.
 Princess Marie of Hesse and by Rhine (1874–1878) died of diphtheria.
 Prince Waldemar of Prussia (1868–1879) also died of diphtheria.
 Prince Albert Victor, Duke of Clarence and Avondale (1864–1892) died of influenza.
 Prince Alfred, Hereditary Prince of Saxe-Coburg and Gotha (1874–1899) shot himself with a revolver and died soon afterward.
 Prince Christian Victor of Schleswig-Holstein (1867–1900) died of malaria while on active service in South Africa during the Boer War.

Victoria, Albert and their children

Ancestors of Victoria and Albert

Victoria and Albert had one pair of grandparents in common, Francis, Duke of Saxe-Coburg-Saalfeld, and Countess Augusta Reuss of Ebersdorf, who were parents both of Albert's father Ernest I, Duke of Saxe-Coburg and Gotha, and of Victoria's mother (and Ernest I's sister), Princess Victoria of Saxe-Coburg-Saalfeld.

Duke Francis & Countess Augusta → Duke Ernest I → Prince Albert
Duke Francis & Countess Augusta → Princess Victoria → Queen Victoria

Another of Victoria's (but not Albert's) grandfathers was King George III, father of Victoria's father, the Duke of Kent, and his brothers King George IV and King William IV.

Marriage of Victoria and Albert

Queen Victoria (who had ascended to the throne on 20 June 1837 and been crowned on 28 June 1838) was married to Prince Albert on 10 February 1840 by William Howley, the Archbishop of Canterbury, in the Chapel Royal of St James's Palace in Westminster (London). (Albert died fourteen-and-a-half years before Victoria was proclaimed Empress of India on 1 May 1876.)

Children of Victoria and Albert
Queen Victoria, at times, had contentious relations with her children. She had trouble relating to her children when they were young, some of this possibly owing to her own isolated childhood. She also, occasionally, resented that they interfered with time that she would prefer to spend with Albert. According to one modern author, both Victoria and Albert weren't above playing favourites with their children, and unfortunately did little to hide their favouritism. Both Vicky and Alfred were the favorites of Albert, and Arthur enjoyed the favouritism of both his parents.

According to one modern author, Victoria initially was jealous of the time that Albert had spent with Vicky, but in her widowhood Victoria made Vicky something of her confidante, and for her part, Vicky had accrued hundreds of letters from her mother, to the point that shortly before her death, she had them smuggled out of Germany by her brother's secretary, Sir Frederick Ponsonby.

Of her sons, Victoria had the most trouble with her eldest, Albert Edward, and her youngest, Leopold. Among her daughters, Victoria clashed often with Louise. She also had an awkward relationship with her second-eldest daughter, Alice, whom the queen, despite praising her thoughtfulness, also criticised as being too melancholy and self-absorbed. In her widowhood, Victoria expected Beatrice, who was only 4 when her father died, to remain at home with her, and only permitted her to marry on the condition that she and her husband remain in England.

Children and grandchildren of Victoria and Albert

Victoria, Princess Royal 
The eldest child of Victoria and Albert was Princess Victoria, the Princess Royal, called "Vicky" (1840–1901).  On 25 January 1858 she married Prince Frederick William of Prussia (1831–1888; Crown Prince from 1861, German Emperor March–June 1888). They had eight children and twenty-three grandchildren.

Not only was the Princess Royal the first child of Queen Victoria and Prince Albert, she also gave them their first grandchild (the future Emperor Wilhelm II, 27 January 1859 – 4 June 1941) and was grandmother to both the first of their 87 great-grandchildren to be born, Princess Feodora of Saxe-Meiningen (19 May 1879 – 26 August 1945), daughter of Princess Charlotte, and to the last of their 29 great-granddaughters to die, Princess Katherine of Greece and Denmark (4 May 1913 – 2 October 2007), daughter of Princess Sophie.

Queen Victoria → Princess Victoria → German Emperor William II → Princess Victoria Louise of Prussia → Princess Frederica of Hanover (Queen of the Hellenes) → King Constantine II

Queen Victoria → Princess Victoria → Princess Sophie of Prussia → King Paul → King Constantine II

Queen Victoria → Princess Victoria → Princess Sophie of Prussia → Helen, Queen of Romania → King Michael I

Children of the Princess Royal and Crown Prince Frederick William of Prussia 

The portrait below shows the Princess Royal with her husband Frederick William and with Victoria and Albert's first two grandchildren, the future Kaiser Wilhelm II (1859–1941) and Princess Charlotte (1860–1919), who were the only grandchildren born during Albert's lifetime.

Edward VII 

Prince Albert Edward (1841–1910), then the Prince of Wales, married Princess Alexandra of Denmark (1844–1925), later Queen Alexandra of the United Kingdom, on 10 March 1863. They had 3 sons (one of whom died within a day), 3 daughters, 7 grandsons (one stillborn) and 3 granddaughters. The Prince of Wales became King Edward VII and Emperor of India at the death of his mother Queen Victoria on 22 January 1901.

Edward's and Alexandra's son, King George V, (reigned 1910–1936) was the father of Kings Edward VIII (reigned 1936) and George VI (1936–1952), and thereby the grandfather of Queen Elizabeth II (reigned 1952–2022) and her sister Princess Margaret (1930–2002). Elizabeth and Margaret were therefore great-granddaughters of Edward VII and great-great-granddaughters of Queen Victoria.

Queen Victoria → King Edward VII → King George V → King George VI → Queen Elizabeth II → King Charles III

Edward's and Alexandra's daughter Princess Maud of Wales became Queen of Norway when her husband, Prince Carl of Denmark, became King Haakon VII (1905–1957) upon the dissolution of Norway's union with Sweden in 1905. Their son, and Edward's grandson, became King Olav V (1957–1991); and Olav's children, King Harald V (since 1991), Princess Ragnhild and Princess Astrid, are thus great-grandchildren of Edward VII and great-great-grandchildren of Victoria and Albert.

Queen Victoria → King Edward VII → Princess Maud of Wales (Queen of Norway) → King Olav V → King Harald V

Children of King Edward VII and Queen Alexandra

Princess Alice 

Princess Alice (1843–1878) married Prince Louis of Hesse (1837–1892), later Grand Duke Louis IV of Hesse, on 1 July 1862. They had two sons (one of which, "Frittie", Prince Friedrich of Hesse, was a haemophiliac and died from bleeding out after a fall out of his mother's bedroom window), five daughters (one of whom died of diphtheria) and 15 grandchildren (two of whom died at a young age). Prince Ludwig succeeded to the Grand Duchy of Hesse as Grand Duke Louis IV of Hesse, and Princess Alice as the Grand Duchess of Hesse, on 13 July 1877.

Alice and Louis's daughter, Princess Victoria of Hesse and by Rhine, married Prince Louis of Battenberg, and was the mother of Princess Alice of Battenberg (1885–1969), who became Alice, Princess Andrew of Greece and Denmark, when she married Prince Andrew of Greece and Denmark on 6 October 1903. Princess Alice was the mother of Prince Philip, Duke of Edinburgh, the prince consort of the United Kingdom who was the husband of Queen Elizabeth II. Princess Victoria was also the mother of Queen Louise of Sweden.

Queen Victoria → Princess Alice → Princess Victoria of Hesse → Princess Alice of Battenberg → Prince Philip, Duke of Edinburgh.

Alice and Louis's second daughter, Princess Elisabeth of Hesse and by Rhine, married, in 1884, the Russian Grand Duke Sergei Alexandrovich, the fifth son of Tsar Alexander II and Empress Maria Alexandrovna, and younger brother of the then reigning Tsar Alexander III. They had no children, but were foster parents to Grand Duchess Maria Pavlovna and Grand Duke Dmitri Pavlovich, children to Sergei's youngest brother Grand Duke Paul Alexandrovich of Russia. Following Sergei's assassination in 1905, she eventually became a nun and was killed by the Bolsheviks on 18 July 1918. She was canonized by the Russian Orthodox Church Outside of Russia in 1981 and in 1992 by the Moscow Patriarchate.

Prince Ernest Louis became Ernest Louis, Grand Duke of Hesse, upon his father's death in 1892. He married his first cousin, Princess Victoria Melita of Saxe-Coburg and Gotha (1876-1936) in 1894, and had one daughter, Princess Elisabeth of Hesse who died of typhoid fever, aged eight. The couple were divorced 21 December 1901. The Grand Duke married for a second time to Princess Eleonore of Solms-Hohensolms-Lich (1871–1937), and had two sons: Georg Donatus, Hereditary Grand Duke of Hesse who married Princess Cecilie of Greece, a sister of Prince Philip, Duke of Edinburgh, and had issue, and Prince Louis of Hesse and by Rhine.

Princess Alix of Hesse, the youngest surviving child of the Grand Ducal pair, became the last Empress of All the Russias through her marriage to Nicholas II of Russia in 1894. They had five children: four girls, the Grand Duchesses Olga, Tatiana, Maria, and Anastasia, and one boy, the Tsarevich Alexei, who was a haemophiliac. The Russian Imperial Family was executed on 17 July 1918 by Bolsheviks. The entire family was canonized by the Russian Orthodox church in 2000.

Queen Victoria → Princess Alice → Princess Alix of Hesse (Tsarina Alexandra Feodorovna of Russia)

Children of Princess Alice and Louis IV of Hesse

Alfred, Duke of Saxe-Coburg and Gotha 
Prince Alfred (1844–1900) married the Grand Duchess Maria Alexandrovna of Russia (1853–1920), the only surviving daughter of Tsar Alexander II and his first wife, Empress Marie Alexandrovna, on 23 January 1874 at the Winter Palace in St Petersburg, Russia. They had 2 sons (one stillborn), 4 daughters, 10 grandsons (8 of whom survived their first week of life) and 9 granddaughters.  In June 1893, Prince Alfred achieved the Royal Navy rank of Admiral of the Fleet, shortly before succeeding his uncle, Ernest II, as Duke of Saxe-Coburg and Gotha in August 1893.

Prince Alfred's daughter (and Queen Victoria's granddaughter) Princess Marie of Edinburgh became Queen of Romania in 1914 after marrying the future King Ferdinand in 1893.
King Ferdinand's and Queen Marie's son King Carol II of Romania (Victoria's great-grandson) was father to King Michael of Romania (a great-great-grandson of Victoria);
their daughter (and Victoria's great-granddaughter) Princess Elisabeth was married from 1921 to 1935 to King George II of Greece (reigned 1922–1924 & 1935–1947); and
their daughter (and Victoria's great-granddaughter) Princess Maria was married to King Alexander I of Yugoslavia (reigned 1921–1934) and the mother of King Peter II (reigned 1934–1945, another great-great-grandson of Queen Victoria)

Queen Victoria → Prince Alfred → Princess Marie of Edinburgh (Queen of Romania) → King Carol II → King Michael I
Queen Victoria → Prince Alfred → Princess Marie of Edinburgh (Queen of Romania) → Princess Elisabeth of Romania (Queen of the Hellenes)
Queen Victoria → Prince Alfred → Princess Marie of Edinburgh (Queen of Romania) → Princess Marie of Romania (Queen of Yugoslavia) → King Peter II

Children of Alfred, Duke of Edinburgh, and Grand Duchess Marie

Princess Helena

Princess Helena (1846–1923) married Prince Christian of Schleswig-Holstein (1831–1917) in Windsor Castle's private chapel on 5 July 1866. Two sons and two daughters survived childhood; two other sons died within ten days of their birth. Princess Helena and Prince Christian had no legitimate grandchildren and one natural granddaughter who died without having issue of her own. Like other British royal holders of German titles (such as Admiral Louis Battenberg), Princess Helena, Prince Christian, and their two daughters gave up their titles to Schleswig-Holstein in 1917 when the British and German Empires were at war.

Children of Princess Helena and Prince Christian of Schleswig-Holstein

Princess Louise

Princess Louise (1848–1939), who married John Campbell, 9th Duke of Argyll (1845–1914) in 1871, was the only one of Victoria's nine children who was childless. She was the first British monarch's child since 1515 to marry a subject rather than someone of royal blood.

Prince Arthur, Duke of Connaught and Strathearn
Prince Arthur (1850–1942) married Princess Louise Margaret of Prussia (1860–1917) on 13 March 1879 at St George's Chapel in Windsor Castle. They had 2 daughters and 1 son.

In March 1911, the Duke of Connaught's nephew, George V (son of the Duke's recently deceased brother Edward VII) appointed his uncle to represent him as Governor General of Canada. He thus became the first, and so far only, Governor General of Canada to be of the Blood Royal, although he had been preceded in this office from 1878 to 1883 by the Marquess of Lorne, the non-royal husband of his sister Princess Louise (see above). [George V's son, the Duke of Gloucester, was later Governor-General of Australia, and the Duke of Connaught's own son was later Governor-General of South Africa. See above and below.]

Prince Arthur's elder daughter (and Queen Victoria's granddaughter) Princess Margaret of Connaught became Crown Princess of Sweden in 1907 after marrying the future Gustaf VI Adolf of Sweden in 1905 (however, Margaret died before Gustav became king).
Princess Margaret and Prince Gustav Adolf's grandson (and a great-great-grandson of Victoria) Carl XVI Gustaf of Sweden is the current monarch of Sweden having reigned from 1973. He is the youngest and only son of Prince Gustaf Adolf, Duke of Västerbotten.
 Their only daughter (and Victoria's great-granddaughter) Princess Ingrid of Sweden married Frederick IX of Denmark (reigned 1947–1972) and was the mother of the present Queen Margrethe II of Denmark and the former Queen Anne-Marie of Greece, great-great-granddaughters of Queen Victoria.
 Their youngest son, Count Carl Johan Bernadotte of Wisborg (1916–2012), was the last great-grandchild of Victoria and Albert to die

Queen Victoria → Prince Arthur → Princess Margaret of Connaught → Prince Gustaf Adolf, Duke of Västerbotten → King Carl XVI Gustaf
Queen Victoria → Prince Arthur → Princess Margaret of Connaught → Princess Ingrid of Sweden → Danish Queen Margrethe II & Greek Queen Anne-Marie
Queen Victoria → Prince Arthur → Princess Margaret of Connaught → Count Carl Johan Bernadotte

Children of Arthur, Duke of Connaught, and Princess Louise Margaret of Prussia

Prince Leopold, Duke of Albany
Prince Leopold (1853–1884) married Princess Helena of Waldeck and Pyrmont (1861–1922) on 27 April 1882 at St George's Chapel, Windsor Castle. They had 1 daughter and 1 son. He inherited the disease of haemophilia from his mother, Queen Victoria, and spent most of his life as a semi-invalid.

His daughter, Princess Alice of Albany, married Prince Alexander of Teck, the younger brother of Queen Mary, in 1904 and became Countess of Athlone when her husband was created Earl of Athlone in June 1917. She has so far been the longest-lived Princess of the Blood Royal of Britain and was the last surviving grandchild of Queen Victoria.

Prince Charles Edward, Prince Leopold's posthumous son, succeeded him at birth as 2nd Duke of Albany. In 1900, Charles Edward succeeded his uncle Alfred as Duke of Saxe-Coburg and Gotha but was forced to abdicate his ducal throne during the German Revolution of 1918, later gaining high positions in and through the Nazi movement. Because of his support for Germany in World War I, he lost his English knighthood in the Order of the Garter in 1915 and his British royal titles, peerages and honours in 1919. He is the grandfather of Carl XVI Gustaf of Sweden through his elder daughter, Princess Sibylla.

Queen Victoria → Prince Leopold → Prince Charles Edward → Princess Sibylla of Saxe-Coburg and Gotha → Carl XVI Gustaf

Children of Leopold, Duke of Albany, and Princess Helena

Princess Beatrice 
Princess Beatrice (1857–1944) married Prince Henry of Battenberg (1858–1896) on 23 July 1885 in St. Mildred's Church, Whippingham on the Isle of Wight. They had 3 sons, 1 daughter (the future Queen Victoria Eugenia of Spain), 5 grandsons (1 stillborn) and 3 granddaughters. The present King Felipe VI of Spain, as a great-grandson of Victoria Eugenie, is a great-great-grandson of Princess Beatrice and thus a great-great-great-grandson of Queen Victoria.

Queen Victoria → Princess Beatrice → Princess Victoria Eugenie of Battenberg (Queen of Spain) → Infante Juan, Count of Barcelona → King Juan Carlos I → King Felipe VI

Due to anti-German feeling during the First World War, the members of the Battenberg family who were British citizens relinquished their titles of Prince and Princess of Battenberg and the styles of Highness and Serene Highness. Under Royal Warrant, they instead took the surname Mountbatten, an Anglicised form of Battenberg.

Both Prince Henry and his youngest son Prince Maurice (the last-born of Victoria's grandchildren) died on active military service, the father from malaria contracted during the Ashanti War and the son in battle on the Western Front of World War I.

Children of Princess Beatrice and Prince Henry of Battenberg

See also
Grandchildren of George V and Mary
List of coupled cousins
 King Christian IX of Denmark, a Father-in-law of Europe
Royal descendants of Queen Victoria and of King Christian IX
John William Friso, Prince of Orange, the most recent ancestor of all current European royal houses until 2022
Royal descendants of John William Friso

References

Sources and external links
Eilers, Marlene A., Queen Victoria's Descendants, Baltimore, Maryland: Genealogical Publishing Co.
Descendants of Queen Victoria of Great Britain and Ireland, 1840-1945, "European Royalty during World War II" (retrieved 3 January 2010)
 Cadbury, Deborah, Queen Victoria's Matchmaking: The royal marriages that shaped Europe, New York: Public Affairs Press, 2017, 

British royalty
Victoria and Albert
Queen Victoria
Albert, Prince Consort
European royal families

fr:Descendance de la reine Victoria du Royaume-Uni